George Carnegie Palmer (December 20, 1861 – February 29, 1934), was an American architect who specialized in civic and academic buildings across the United States. He best known for his work with the architect Henry F. Hornbostel. By 1904, Palmer & Hornbostel ranked "among the leading architects in the United States."

Early life 
Palmer was born in New York City and grew up in Manhattan on Madison Avenue. He was the son of Sarah Parker and Nicholas F. Palmer, a banker. He attended Columbia University, graduating with a degree in architecture in 1883. While at Columbia, he was a member of the Fraternity of Delta Psi (St. Anthony Hall).

Career 

In 1888 and 1889, Palmer worked for architect Frederick Clarke Withers as a general superintendent for the construction of the Chapel of the Good Shepherd and other structures on Blackwell Island. However, Palmer would form and reorganize his own partnerships throughout his career.

Wood and  Palmer 
In 1890, Palmer established the firm of Wood and Palmer, Architects in New York City with George Edward Wood, another graduate of Columbia University and a native New Yorker. Henry F. Hornbostel worked for Wood and Palmer after graduating from Columbia University in 1891. However, he left to attend the École des Beaux-Arts in France after two years.

Wood, Palmer & Hornbostel 
In 1897, Hornbostel returned from France and joined the firm which became Wood, Palmer and Hornbostel. In this early phase of their career, they designed a number of mansions in New York City. 

In 1889, Palmer and Hornbostel designed an early French Renaissance style house for Edith S. Logan, widow of John A. Logan, located at 434 Riverside Drive in New York City. The Logan mansion was five stories tall, plus a basement. On July 4, 1912, the Columbia chapter of the Fraternity of Delta Psi (St. Anthony Hall) purchased the house from Logan and still use it today as their chapter house It is listed on the National Register of Historic Places as Delta Psi, Alpha chapter. It is also a contributing building to the Broadway-Riverside Drive Historic District.

Palmer & Hornbostel 
Around 1900, Wood left the practice and the firm changed its name to Palmer & Hornbostel, Architects. They operated at both 63 William Street, New York City and Pittsburgh, Pennsylvania, circa 1900 through 1909. In 1901, Palmer & Hornbostel designed new buildings for the Steinway & Sons factory.  

In 1904, Palmer won a technical school competition held by the Committee of Carnegie Technical Schools (later Carnegie Mellon University) for its new campus. The project covered an area of 35 acres had a budget of $5,000,000, with the architects commission being 5%. Warren P. Laird, head of architecture at the University of Pennsylvania and one of the judges, said, "The buildings are treated with a simple yet effective use of brick and terra cotta. They are so designed and massed as to  be beautiful, while expressing, each in its own way, the purpose for which it is intended. The architect has been very successful in securing to the highest degree practical efficiency in his plans without sacrifice of that character which is usually called the artistic."

Although Hornbostel is frequently credited with all of the work on the Carnegie Technical School, reports in the newspaper indicate that Palmer was on site working on the campus layout and is also the one meeting with the school's committee. Because of the hilly nature of the proposed campus, Palmer said, "It was not the exterior of the buildings that we found the hard task, but in the arranging of the area for the various buildings, so as to obtain the best results. We have mapped out the general ground plan for the buildings, according to the floor area required."

In New York City, they worked on the Brooklyn Bridge Terminal Station, Flatbush Unitarian Church (1903), the Williamsburg Bridge (1905), and the Queensboro Bridge (1906). In 1907, Palmer & Hornbostel also designed a stadium for Columbia University; however, the stadium was never built because of funding problems. 

Also in 1907, Palmer & Hornbostel designed the New York State Education Building in Albany, gaining the contract by winning another design competition. The exterior of the Education Building is based on he Tomb of Mausolus at Halicarnassus in Turkey. The building features sixty foot tall columns of steel covered in marble with Corinthian capitals in terra cotta Steel construction not only enabled the building's size and height, but made it safe from fire. Consistent with archaeological findings of ancient Greek structures, Palmer & Hornbostel used the colors blue, green, red, and yellow on the building's capital, frieze, and walls. Inside is a rotunda with Doric columns of Indiana limestone, yellow brick floors, a cerulean blue ceiling with skylights, and a ninety foot tall dome. The building also included a library with a thirty foot tall vaulted ceiling by Rafael Guastavino. The New York Times said, "Imagine a Greek temple with electric elevators." They continued, "It is a beautiful expression of all that education means..."

Palmer, Hornbostel and Jones 
Between 1908 and 1919, Palmer and Hornbostel joined with the architect Sullivan W. Jones to form Palmer, Hornbostel and Jones, Architects. This firm operated in Albany, New York; Atlanta, Georgia; New York City; and Oakland, California and specialized in university and governmental buildings. An alumnus of M.I.T., Jones had been the chief draftsman of Palmer & Hornbostel when they worked on the Carnegie Technical School project.

In 1909, they were hired to design the campus of the University of Pittsburgh. However, only five buildings of their Acropolis Plan were built before the university ran out of funding. 

The firm designed the Oakland City Hall for Oakland, California (1914), Hartford City Hall for Hartford, Connecticut (1915), City Hall and Courthouse for Wilmington, Delaware (1917), and Pittsburgh City-County Building (1917). The latter was designed in collaboration with the architect Edward Brown Lee who was employed by the firm. They received a contract for the Oakland City Hall through a national design contest; perhaps because they decorated the granite building with California's crops such as figs, grapes, olives and wheat rendered in terra cotta. When it was built, the Beaux Arts style Oakland City Hall was the tallest building west of the Mississippi River. It is now listed on the National Register of Historic Places.

They also laid out the campus and designed buildings for Emory University in Atlanta from 1914-1919, as well as dormitory and fraternity houses for Northwestern University in Chicago, Illinois in 1915-1918. 

With the outbreak of World War I, Jones left to become the supervising architect for the Naval Operating Base in Norfolk, Virginia. After the war, Jones became state architect for New York and did not return to their practice. In 1918, the fifty-year-old Hornbostel headed to France to serve as a major in the Army's gas defense department.

Palmer & Hornbostel II 
When Jones left the firm, its name reverted back to Palmer & Hornbostel. This name stayed in place from around 1918 to 1922. Hornbostel initially retained a home in New York but moved to Pittsburgh around 1921 because of frequent projects in that city.

Between 1918 and 1921, Palmer & Hornbostel were consultants to the Concrete Steel Engineering Company for the design of High Level Bridge in Fairmont, West Virginia. This project was dubbed the "million dollar bridge" when it exceeded pre-bid estimates of $400,000. The bridge is 1,320 feet long and had three reinforced concrete arches and light fixtures with mouth-blown glass shades. The bridge is listed on the National Register of Historic Places as the Robert H. Mollohan-Jefferson Street Bridge.

Palmer and Plonsky 
Starting in 1923, Palmer was a partner in the firm Palmer and Plonsky, Architects in Manhattan with architect Samuel E. Plonsky. Plonsky had been an unnamed partner in both Palmer, Hornbostel and Jones and Palmer & Hornbostel, working there by the mid-1910s.  A modern architectural historian notes, "At a time when white Anglo-Saxon Protestant men controlled virtually all of the premier architectural firms in New York, it is likely that Plonsky long remained an uncredited partner because he was a Jew of Russian-Polish heritage." Palmer remained with this firm until his death.

One of Palmer and Plonsky's projects was a three-story nurses' home for the Morristown Memorial Hospital in Morristown, New Jersey in 1922. They also designed a seven-story garage for C. G. Taylor & Co. for the Columbus Circle District in New York City.

Professional affiliations 
Palmer was a member of the Architectural League of New York from 1895 to 1934.

Projects 
Following is a selected list of Palmer's projects:

Personal 
Palmer married Helen Campbell on June 2,1892 in Calvary Church, New York City. They had four children; three daughters survived infancy: Helen C. Palmer (born 1895), Sarah S. Palmer (born 1897), and Georgiana K. Palmer (born 1899. In 1900, the family lived at 48 West 9th Street in Greenwich Village with three servants/nurses. By 1910, the family had moved to 65 Miller Road in Morristown, New Jersey where they lived with two servants.

Palmer was a director of both the Morris County Savings Bank and the Morristown Trust Company. He was a member of the Morris County Golf Club, the St. Anthony Club of New York, and the Morristown Club of which he was president of for 25 years.

Palmer died at his home in Morristown, New Jersey in 1934.

References 

1861 births
1934 deaths
People from New York City
Columbia Graduate School of Architecture, Planning and Preservation alumni
St. Anthony Hall
Architects from New York City
Architects from Pittsburgh
19th-century American architects
20th-century American architects